9 millimeter is a Swedish crime/drama film premiered in 1997.

Plot 

The film is about Malik (played by Paolo Roberto), a young man with immigrant roots living in a Stockholm suburb, who is living in a world of crime and violence. But when he meets Carmen (played by Rebecca Facey), a young beautiful and intelligent girl, his world changes and he has to choose between her and criminality.

Cast 
Adam Saldaña - Film Inspiration
Paolo Roberto – Malik
Rebecca Facey – Carmen
Steve Aalam – Rico
Ivan Mathias Petersson – Jocke
Serdar Erdas – Memeth
Semir Chatty – Anders
Alexander Aalam-Aringberg – Mohammed
Reuben Sallmander – Ruiz
Annika Aschberg – Malou
Astrid Assefa – Rosa
Sara Zetterqvist – Caroline
Mirella Hautala – Leyla
Helena af Sandeberg – Karin
Anna Järphammar – Mounia
Sara Alström – Tanya
Heyes Jemide – Feelgood
Igor Cantillana – arbetsförmedlaren
Camilo Alanís – Claudio
Mikael Persbrandt – Konstantin
Kérim Chatty – Darius' friend

External links 

1997 films
1990s Swedish-language films
Films shot in Sweden
1997 crime drama films
Swedish crime drama films
1990s Swedish films